Suitcase101 is a Filipino band that was formed in 2004 by a group of students. Listed as one of the Philippines top 100 groups, famous and most lauded for its original rock novelty songs and often satirical covers of famous songs. The band has since transcended musical genres, varying styles from one song to another - alternative rock to pop rock, funk to rapcore, and so on - while providing comic relief to their listeners. who became popular after winning the Globe Kantabataan singing tilt.

Early life and career 
The band was formed in 2004. The name Suitcase101 was derived from the band Matchbox20, whom at that time the band started was quite popular. Formed in the mid-2005, Suitcase101 started as an acoustic band in a local resto bar in Bohol who left the band for some reasons. Vocalist Adrian Bayron was in the band then.

Its metamorphosis was closely watched by fans from being an acoustic band to alternative rock band. Suitcase101 continued performing and composing songs the new members decided to take the "band thing" seriously. With Adrian on vocals, Alva Duaban on guitars, Arvin Avergonzado on drums and Venjo Busalla on bass. Slowly gaining popularity with their first original composition "Kalahati" as their regular audience would bring over a friend the next time they come. There was even a time that the song was played twice on the same night as late comers would insist on requesting for the song even though it was already played earlier.

They recorded the song "Kalahati" and two other original tracks namely "Never Need Someone" and "Three Years Since" in Backyard Project Studios in Cebu City last March 2007. They burst into Bohol's music scene as they released "Kalahati" and "Never Need Some" on local radio stations 911 FM and 102.3 Kiss FM, winning 6 Battle of the Bands, and opened for Manila-based artists such as Bamboo, Imago, Moonstar88, Hale and Urbandub to name a few.

Suitcase101 created a wave when the band the national search of the GlobeKantabataan 2007. It seems that there was no depth on the band's name, but during the course of the Globe Kantabataan competition, the band was frequently traveling back and forth Manila and Bohol. They discovered that traveling together with the band makes their bond a lot stronger and they just love traveling together. Hence, the name Suitcase101 just fit quite right for the band.

Slowly gaining recognition in the Visayas area as their songs "Kalahati" and Globe Kantabataan winning entry "Posible ang Lahat" are enjoying regular airplay in Cebu's radio stations 91.5 Hot FM and 93.1 Smash FM. The recent Battle of the Band that they won was Sandugo Battle of the Bands '07 where Adrian won the Best Vocalist, Alva as the Best Guitarist, and Arvin won as the Best Drummer for the third time. But the most prestigious competition they have won is the Globe Kantabataan '07. Besting over hundreds of hopefuls and making them 7-time Battle of the Bands Champions.

Following the success of Globe Kantabataan, Alva decided to leave the band to pursue his nursing degree. Felix Oliver Bacareza, who had already played with the band as a session guitarist in the past, took his place.

Suitcases101 performed at the Sanggunang Kabataan (SK) National Congress 2008 singing the SK theme song with Philippine Pres. Gloria Macapagal Arroyo as guest of honor. On December 19, 2016, the band was featured on Julius Babao's Mission Possible for supporting a girl fighting against cancer. The full episode was aired right after ABS-CBN's news program Bandila.

Award 
Grand champion, Globe Kantabataan

Album 
After three years, Suitcase101 has a self-titled debut album. They don't have regrets releasing a "late" album as the cliché goes, there's time for everything.

The album has 11 songs--- Riddle, Three Years Since, Kalahati, Never Need Someone (they hate girls!), 163, Starlight, Foreman, Handuraw, Boholano, Live Loud Kicking Out and Lakas ng Himig, the official theme song of the Sangguniang Kabataan--- with two bonus tracks, Kalahati acoustic version and Possible Ang Lahat.

Band members
Adrian Bayron (vocals)
Jairus Bayron (rhythm guitar)
Felix Oliver Bacareza (lead guitar)
Venjo Busalla (bass)
Mike Miranda (drums)

Past members 
Arvin Avergonzado (drums)
Alva Duaban (guitars)
Chris Cornelio (guitars)

Sources

External links 
 Official website (archived)

Filipino rock music groups
Filipino rock singers
2004 establishments in the Philippines
Musical groups established in 2004